Frenzy is a 2015 Turkish drama film directed by Emin Alper. It was screened in the main competition section of the 72nd Venice International Film Festival where it won the Special Jury Prize. It was screened in the Contemporary World Cinema section of the 2015 Toronto International Film Festival.

Cast
 Mehmet Özgür as Kadir
 Tülin Özen as Meral
 Berkay Ateş as Ahmet
 Müfit Kayacan as Hamza

References

External links
 

2015 films
2015 drama films
Turkish drama films
2010s Turkish-language films
Venice Special Jury Prize winners
Films directed by Emin Alper